How to Make a Spaceship: A Band of Renegades, An Epic Race, And the Birth of Private Spaceflight  is a bestselling award-winning 2016 non-fiction book by journalist Julian Guthrie about the origins of the X Prize Foundation and Peter Diamandis, the first X Prize, the Ansari X Prize and Anousheh Ansari, the entrants into that suborbital spaceflight competition, and the winning team, Mojave Aerospace Ventures of Vulcan Inc., Paul G. Allen, Scaled Composites, Burt Rutan, and their platform of Tier One of SpaceShipOne and WhiteKnightOne.

Synopsis
The book is an overview of what led to the creation of the X Prize, and the running of that first X Prize. Profiles of all the major players in the X Prize saga are included in the book. It chronologically starts with the influences that weighed upon Peter Diamandis, and his progression into the space industry. It also covers the process to get funding, rejections, and the arrival of the Ansaris, becoming title sponsors. The book surveys several of the teams that entered into the competition to win the Ansari X Prize. The team that is focused on most is that which won the X Prize in 2004, the one headed by Paul Allen and Burt Rutan, of SpaceShipOne. The book ends with an epilogue about Richard Branson's Virgin Galactic scooping up the SpaceShipOne technology, and the spaceplane itself ending up in the Smithsonian National Air and Space Museum. The book includes a preface by Richard Branson, and an afterword by Stephen Hawking.

Publication
The book was originally entitled Beyond: Peter Diamandis and the Adventure of Space, when it was sold preemptively to Penguin Books in 2014. How to Make a Spaceship was released in September 2016, in trade paperback, hardcover, audio book and e-book formats. The work was a finalist for a PEN Award, the 2017 PEN/E.O. Wilson Literary Science Writing Award. The publication won the 2016 Eugene E. Emme Award for Astronautical Literature in September 2017. It became a New York Times listed bestseller. The book has appeared on several "Best Of" book lists. Several parties have expressed interest in obtaining the filming rights to the book.

Reception
Gregg Easterbrook's review in the Wall Street Journal said of the book that “How to Make a Spaceship offers a rousing anthem to the urge to explore."

Bibliography

Awards and honors
 New York Times - Science Literature - Best Sellers - November 2016 (announced November 2016) 
 Finalist — 2017 PEN/E. O. Wilson Literary Science Writing Award (announced January 2017) 
 Winner — 2016 Eugene M. Emme Astronautical Literature Award (announced September 2017)

See also
 Ansari X Prize
 Black Sky: The Race For Space, 2004 Discovery Channel television documentary about the Ansari X Prize
 Elon Musk: Tesla, SpaceX, and the Quest for a Fantastic Future, 2015 book by Ashlee Vance, biography about Elon Musk
 The Right Stuff, 1979 book by Tom Wolfe about the U.S. side of the Cold War Space Race
 The Spirit of St. Louis, 1953 book by Charles A. Lindbergh, autobiography and memoir of the famous solo non-stop trans-Atlantic flight for the Orteig Prize win

References

Further reading
 
 
 Talks at Google, Google (10 November 2016)

External links
 Official website: http://www.howtomakeaspaceship.com/
 Penguin Books Random House, How to Make a Spaceship By Julian Guthrie (2016)
 Julian Guthrie, How to Make a Spaceship (julianguthriesf.com)
 X-Prize Foundation, The New Book: How To Make A Spaceship (16 September 2016)

Ansari X Prize
Spaceflight books
Engineering books
American non-fiction books
2016 non-fiction books
Penguin Books books